Palm Center Transit Center is a light rail station in Houston, Texas on the METRORail system. It is the terminus of the Purple Line and is located on Griggs Road near Beekman Road in the Palm Center neighborhood.

Palm Center Transit Center opened to light rail service on May 23, 2015.

References

METRORail stations
Railway stations in the United States opened in 2015
2015 establishments in Texas
Railway stations in Harris County, Texas